Haze Fan is a Chinese journalist and a member of Bloomberg News’s bureau in Beijing, formerly working also for CNBC, Al Jazeera, CBS and Reuters’s bureaus in Beijing. On December 7, 2020, Fan was escorted from her apartment building by plainclothes security officials, and has not been heard from since. On December 11, 2020, Chinese authorities announced that Fan had been detained by the Beijing National Security Bureau, saying that her "legitimate rights have been fully ensured and her family has been notified."

References 

Living people
Chinese prisoners and detainees
Chinese journalists
Enforced disappearances in China
Year of birth missing (living people)